Nikkomycins are a group of antifungal medications. They work by interfering with the building of the fungal cell wall which results in the fungal cell breaking open. They were discovered in 1976. The specific agent nikkomycin Z has weak activity against Aspergillus fumigatus which may be of benefit when used with other medications, such as caspofungin, ranconazole and amphotericin B, fluconazole or itraconazole. Nikkomycin Z also inhibits growth of Batrachochytrium dendrobatidis, a serious fungal pathogen linked to global amphibian declines, while lower concentrations of Nikkomycin Z enhanced natural amphibian antimicrobial skin peptide effectiveness in vitro.

Originally identified from Streptomyces tendae, the nikkomycins are chitin synthase inhibitors.

References

Antifungals